Associação Cultural Esporte Clube Baraúnas, or Baraúnas as they are usually called, is a Brazilian football team from Mossoró in Rio Grande do Norte, founded on January 14, 1960.

History
In 1924, Baraúnas was initially a carnival block (meaning bloco carnavalesco in Portuguese).

Some of the members of this block, on January 14, 1960, founded Esporte Clube Baraúnas.

In 1966, Esporte Clube Baraúnas changed its name to Associação Cultural Esporte Clube Baraúnas.

In 1989, Baraúnas competed in the Campeonato Brasileiro Série B, being eliminated in the first stage.

In 1998, the club competed in the Campeonato Brasileiro Série C, being eliminated in the first stage.

In 2005, Baraúnas competed in the Copa do Brasil for the first time. In the first stage, the club beat América Mineiro, in the second stage, the club beat Vitória, in the third stage, Baraúnas beat Vasco da Gama, but in the quarterfinals, the club was eliminated by Cruzeiro.

In 2006, Baraúnas won its first state championship, beating its rival, Potiguar de Mossoró, in the final. Baraúnas' Luciano Paraíba was the competition's top goalscorer, with 11 goals.

Titles
 Campeonato Potiguar: 2006
 Copa Rio Grande do Norte: 2004, 2007
 Campeonato Mossoroense: 1961, 1962, 1963, 1967, 1977
 Copa Oeste: 2000

Idols
Etevaldo (1960s)
Romildo (1980s)
Cícero Ramalho (1990s and 2000s)
Isaías (1990s and 2000s)
Nildo (1990s and 2000s)

Current squad

First Team

Stadium

Baraúnas' home stadium is the Nogueirão stadium, which has a maximum capacity of 25,000 people.

Derby
Baraúnas' greatest rival is Potiguar de Mossoró. The derby is known as Potiba.

Mascot
The club's mascot is a lion called "Leão da doze". Doze anos (Twelve years, in English) is the name of the neighborhood where the club is located.

Anthem
Olismar Lima and Francisco Diógenes are the creators of the official anthem's lyrics, and Maestro Batista and Francisco Diógenes are the music authors.

References

External links
 Official website
 Fansite

Association football clubs established in 1960
Baraunas
1960 establishments in Brazil